Elizaveta Pavlovna Gerdt (– 6 November 1975) was a Russian dancer and teacher whose career links the Russian imperial and Soviet schools of classical dance.

A daughter of celebrated dancer Paul Gerdt, she studied under Michel Fokine at the Imperial Ballet School, where her chief partner was Vaslav Nijinsky. She married another popular danseur, Samuil Adrianov (1884-1917; the first husband), who danced with Pierina Legnani and Mathilde Kschessinska, two ballerinas she sought to emulate.

After the Russian Revolution Elizaveta Gerdt and Olga Spessivtseva were the only world-class dancers who chose to remain in Russia, while others emigrated to the West. 

In 1928, after 20 years of dancing, she resolved to abandon the stage and devote herself to teaching. She taught the class of perfection for the female dancers in the Leningrad Opera and Ballet Theatre together with teaching the girls in her Alma mater (1927-1934). Then she moved from Leningrad to Moscow. There she taught the class for the female dancers at the Bolshoi Theatre, coaching ballerinas of the Bolshoi Ballet and also worked at the Moscow Ballet School (1935-1942 and 1945-1960).

Among her students were Alla Shelest (in Leningrad), Irina Tikhomirnova, Maya Plisetskaya, Violetta Bovt, Mira Redina, Raisa Struchkova, Ekaterina Maksimova (in Moscow). With some of them she continued to collaborate at the theatre. Thus she coached Sulamith Messerer and later her niece Maya Plisetskaya.

See also
List of Russian ballet dancers

References

1891 births
1975 deaths
Ballerinas from the Russian Empire
Ballet teachers
Vaganova graduates
Soviet ballerinas